Patrick Hayes (born 21 June 1966) is an Irish former Gaelic footballer who played as a right wing-forward at senior level for the Cork county team.

Hayes joined the team during the 1986 championship and was a regular member of the starting fifteen until his retirement after the 1992 championship. During that time he won one All-Ireland and two Munster medals. Evans was an All-Ireland runner-up on one occasion.

At club level Hayes is a one-time All-Ireland medalist with St Finbarr's. In addition to this he has also won one Munster medal and one county club championship medal.

References

1966 births
Living people
Cork inter-county Gaelic footballers
Munster inter-provincial Gaelic footballers
St Finbarr's Gaelic footballers